Trestle or Trestles may refer to:

 Structures and structural elements
 Trestle support, the structural element that supports a trestle bridge, trestle desk, trestle table, or similar structures
 Trestle bridge, a bridge composed of trestle support elements
 Trestle desk, a desk supported by trestle support elements
 Trestle table, a table supported by trestle support elements
 Trestle (mill), part of a post mill consisting of a structure of trestle support elements
 Trestle tree, a structure that is part of a traditional square rigged sailing ship's top 
 Trestles Bridge, a railroad viaduct in California
 Trestle (heraldry), a charge in heraldry depicting a three-legged tripod traditionally used as a stool or table support
 Trestles (surfing), a surfing location in California with a name that refers to a nearby trestle bridge structure
 Trestle (also known as ATLAS-I), a non-nuclear electromagnetic pulse test facility for aircraft supported by the world's largest trestle structure made entirely of wood and glue

See also
 Tressel (disambiguation)